Henry Kelly (29 July 1898 – 1 July 1983) was a South African cricketer. He played in seventeen first-class matches from 1920/21 to 1926/27.

References

External links
 

1898 births
1983 deaths
South African cricketers
Border cricketers
Eastern Province cricketers
Griqualand West cricketers